List of episodes for the X Minus One radio show.

1955

1956

1957

1958

1973

See also
List of Dimension X episodes

References
 Jerry Haendiges Vintage Radio Logs: X Minus One
 Internet Archive list of X Minus One episodes

Lists of radio series episodes